Maria Fernanda Alves and Patricia Maria Țig were the defending champions, but Țig chose to compete in Wuhan instead. Alves partnered Gabriela Cé, but lost in the semifinals to Ysaline Bonaventure and Elise Mertens.

Bonaventure and Mertens then went on to win the title, defeating María Irigoyen and Barbora Krejčíková in the final, 6–4, 4–6, [10–6].

Seeds

Draw

References 
 Draw

Abierto Victoria - Doubles